Brockway is a borough in Jefferson County, Pennsylvania, United States. The population was 2,072 at the 2010 census.

History
The community was laid out as "Brockwayville" in 1836. The borough was named for Alonzo and John S. Brockway, who came to the site in 1822. A post office called "Brockwayville" was established in 1829, and the name of the post office was changed to "Brockway" in 1925.

The Brockwayville Passenger Depot, Buffalo, Rochester and Pittsburgh Railroad was added to the National Register of Historic Places in 2003.

The Brockway Glass Company Inc. was founded in 1907 in by the Brockway Machine Bottle Company (which later became Brockway Glass). Brockway manufactured and sold glass containers and tubing, along with plastic products manufactured through wholly owned subsidiaries. In 1964 Brockway bought several Hazel-Atlas Glass Company factories from the Continental Can Company as part of a lawsuit settlement. In 1987 Owens-Illinois made a bid of $60 per share (worth $750million) to acquire Brockway, which was met with resistance by the FTC. After a federal district judge denied the FTC's request for an injunction, Owens-Illinois acquired Brockway's shares.

2013 State Police shooting

On Thursday, September 26, 2013, two Pennsylvania State Police troopers were serving a warrant to a resident just outside Brockway around 2:30 pm on Cemetery Road. When the troopers knocked on the door, they were answered with gunshots. One trooper was hit in the neck and chest but was pulled to safety by the other trooper. The injured trooper was life-flighted to UPMC Altoona, listed in critical condition.

The suspect retreated to his home while multiple police agencies from the surrounding area responded to the scene. He barricaded himself inside and kept police forces on scene overnight. The SERT team was on scene to provide assistance, as well as multiple Pennsylvania State Police helicopters which circled the area in case the suspect tried to flee his house. It is believed but not confirmed that officers couldn't storm the house because the suspect was threatening to blow up a meth lab inside his residence.

Both the schools in the Brockway Area School District were locked down, and no students were permitted to leave the buildings. The lockdown began shortly after the shooting and lasted until 6:00 PM that evening. The school is located roughly two miles away from the scene. The police also asked that all residents remained inside, as this situation was still labeled as an active shooter over night. The wounded officer was eventually life flighted a second time to University of Pittsburgh Medical Center where he was in a stable, but critical condition.

The standoff ended on Friday morning, September 27, 2013. A news conference was held at 10:30 AM on the 27th from the DuBois State Police Barracks. Officials announced that the suspect was killed in the early morning standoff which lasted 11 hours. The suspect was 60-year-old Kenneth Lees. Senior Officers tried multiple times to contact and reason with Lees, but they were all unsuccessful. Around 1 AM, police forces entered Lees' home to find that he was dead due a self-inflicted gunshot wound.

Lees' son was also involved in an overnight chase with officers. Police wanted to contact the son to help talk with Kenneth, but when they attempted to pull over the vehicle, he fled. Officers were led on a 25-mile chase that ended with him fleeing through the woods. One officer was injured in the endeavor but officers did eventually catch up with the man who is now in jail under charges of fleeing from police and aggravated assault.

Geography
Brockway is located in northeastern Jefferson County at  (41.247839, -78.791270), in the valley of Little Toby Creek, a northward-flowing tributary of the Clarion River and part of the Allegheny River watershed. U.S. Route 219 passes through the borough, leading northeast  to Ridgway and south  to DuBois. Pennsylvania Route 28 has its eastern terminus at US 219 in Brockway and leads west  to Brookville.

Demographics

As of the census of 2000, there were 2,182 people, 911 households, and 584 families residing in the borough. The population density was 1,879.5 people per square mile (726.3/km²). There were 994 housing units at an average density of 856.2 per square mile (330.8/km²). The racial makeup of the borough was 99.68% White, 0.05% Native American, 0.18% Asian, and 0.09% from two or more races. Hispanic or Latino of any race were 0.09% of the population.

There were 911 households, out of which 28.9% had children under the age of 18 living with them, 49.0% were married couples living together, 11.5% had a female householder with no husband present, and 35.8% were non-families. 33.2% of all households were made up of individuals, and 20.5% had someone living alone who was 65 years of age or older. The average household size was 2.30 and the average family size was 2.91.

In the borough the population was spread out, with 23.6% under the age of 18, 7.0% from 18 to 24, 26.3% from 25 to 44, 18.4% from 45 to 64, and 24.7% who were 65 years of age or older. The median age was 40 years. For every 100 females there were 90.6 males. For every 100 females age 18 and over, there were 83.3 males.

The median income for a household in the borough was $34,556, and the median income for a family was $41,278. Males had a median income of $34,950 versus $21,875 for females. The per capita income for the borough was $18,303. About 5.7% of families and 9.9% of the population were below the poverty line, including 12.8% of those under age 18 and 9.6% of those age 65 or over.

Public services

Education
 Brockway Area School District
 Brockway Area Junior/Senior High School

Notable people
Brockway was the home of Dr. James Poole, who holds numerous patents in glass technology.
 Brockway is the hometown of Joe Scarnati, former President Pro Tempore of the State Senate.
 Brockway is the birthplace of Andrew Thomas Kearney, founder of the management consulting firm A.T. Kearney and winner of the Presidential Medal of Freedom.
 Brockway is also the hometown of Kevin Benson, retired meteorologist for WPXI, Channel 11 News, based in Pittsburgh, Pennsylvania.
 Eustace L. Brockway, former member of the Wisconsin State Assembly, was born in what was then Brockwayville.

References

Boroughs in Jefferson County, Pennsylvania
Populated places established in 1822
1836 establishments in Pennsylvania